Miyoshi (written: 三好, 三善, 三吉 or 見吉) is a Japanese surname. Notable people with the surname include:

, Japanese composer
, Japanese idol, singer, model and actress
, Japanese pop singer
, Japanese footballer
, Japanese footballer
, Japanese Confucianist
, Japanese footballer
, Japanese photographer
Manabu Miyoshi (1861–1939), Japanese botanist
Mark Miyoshi, Japanese-American musical instrument maker
, Japanese samurai and daimyō
, Japanese sociologist
, Japanese samurai and daimyō
, Japanese women's basketball player
, Japanese rower
, Japanese shipbuilding academic
, Japanese video game producer
, Japanese footballer
, Japanese poet, literary critic, and literary editor
, Japanese swimmer
, Japanese zoologist, ichthyologist, and myriapodologist
, Japanese samurai
, Japanese samurai and daimyō
Sheila Miyoshi Jager (born 1963), American anthropologist

Fictional characters
, a character in the anime series Yuki Yuna is a Hero

See also
Miyoshi clan, a Japanese clan

Japanese-language surnames